The 1984–54 FIBA Korać Cup was the 14th edition of FIBA's Korać Cup basketball competition. The Italian Simac Milano defeated the Italian Ciaocrem Varese in the final on March 21, 1985 in Brussels, Belgium.

First round

|}

Second round

|}

Automatically qualified to round of 16
  Orthez (title holder)
  Crvena zvezda
  Jollycolombani Cantù
  Simac Milano

Round of 16

Semi finals

|}

Final
March 21, Palais du Midi, Brussels

|}

External links
 1984–85 FIBA Korać Cup @ linguasport.com
1984–85 FIBA Korać Cup

1984–85
1984–85 in European basketball